Strelki is a Russian pop music group formed in 1997, best known for their song "Ty brosil menya" (Ты бросил меня; You Left Me), which became a hit in Russia. The group was created as a Russian version of Spice Girls. After the split-up of original line-up, the band performed few years with secondary line-ups. In 2016, original Strelki line-up reunited.

Discography

Albums

Videos

References

External links
 About Strelki on zvezdi.ru 

Russian pop music groups
Russian girl groups
Musical groups established in 1997